is a Japanese animator and character designer.

Career
Sugiyama joined Shaft in 2001 as a rookie in-between animator to the industry. By 2003, he had been promoted to the position of key animator; and by 2004, he started working as an animation director. In 2007, Sugiyama designed the characters to the studio's adaptation of Ef visual novel, and has since been one of the studio's main character designers. Three years later, he designed the characters for Arakawa Under the Bridge; in 2014, he designed the characters for the Nisekoi franchise; and in 2016, he designed the characters for March Comes In like a Lion. In 2022, he designed the characters to RWBY: Ice Queendom, Shaft's original anime project based on the American web series RWBY. Outside of his animation duties, Sugiyama also occasionally storyboards episodes.

Works
This is an incomplete list.

Teleivison series
 Highlights character design and chief animation direction roles.

OVAs/ONAs

References

External links

Japanese animators
Living people